Capital punishment is a legal penalty in the U.S. state of Indiana. The last man executed in the state, excluding federal executions at Terre Haute, was the murderer Matthew Wrinkles in 2009.

Capital punishment by the United States federal government takes place at the United States Penitentiary, Terre Haute, in Indiana; however the state has no control over executions there.

Legal process
When the prosecution seeks the death penalty, the sentence is decided by the jury and must be unanimous.

In case of a hung jury during the penalty phase of the trial, the judge decides the sentence.

Indiana was one of the four states (alongside Alabama, Delaware and Florida) that had allowed a judge to override a jury's recommendation of a life sentence to the death penalty or death penalty to a life sentence. The Indiana override statute was abolished in 2002.

The power of clemency belongs to the Governor of Indiana after receiving a non-binding advice from the Indiana Parole Board.

Capital crimes
The following constitutes first-degree murder with aggravating circumstances, which is the only capital crime in Indiana.

The murder was especially heinous, atrocious, cruel or depraved (or involved torture)
The capital offense was committed during the commission of, attempt of, or escape from a specified felony (kidnapping, rape, sodomy, arson, oral copulation, train wrecking, carjacking, criminal gang activity, drug dealing, or aircraft piracy).
The murder was committed from a motor vehicle or near a motor vehicle that transported the defendant.
The murder was committed by intentionally discharging a firearm into an inhabited dwelling.
The defendant killed the victim while lying in wait.
The murder was committed by means of a bomb, destructive device, explosive, or similar device.
The defendant caused or directed another to commit murder, or the defendant procured the commission of the offense by payment, promise of payment, or anything of pecuniary value.
The victim of the murder was less than 12 years of age.
The victim was a pregnant woman, and the murder resulted in the intentional killing of a fetus that has attained viability.

Post-Furman 
In 1972, the U.S. Supreme Court in Furman v. Georgia held all state capital punishment sentencing statutes were unconstitutional. As a result, all seven men on Indiana's death row at the time had their sentences reduced to life in prison. The Indiana General Assembly enacted a new death penalty sentencing statute to replace the statute struck down by the U.S. Supreme Court in Furman in 1973. In 1977, the Indiana Supreme Court struck down Indiana's 1973 capital punishment statute based on the U.S. Supreme Court decision in Woodson v. North Carolina. The death sentences of the eight men on Indiana's death row were set aside. On October 1, 1977, a new Indiana capital punishment statute, modeled on statutes upheld by U.S. Supreme Court, took effect. It remains in effect today.

See also
 List of people executed in Indiana
 List of death row inmates in Indiana
 Crime in Indiana
 Law of Indiana

References

External links
Capital Punishment in Indiana- Indianapolis Star

 
Indiana law
Indiana